Louis Bostyn (born 4 October 1993) is a Belgian professional footballer who plays for S.V. Zulte Waregem in the Belgian Pro League as a goalkeeper.

Career

Bostyn played two seasons in the Belgian Second Division with K.S.V. Roeselare. In July 2014 he joined S.V. Zulte Waregem in the Belgian Pro League. He made his first team debut at 17 July 2014 in the UEFA Europa League qualifying round against Zawisza Bydgoszcz.

References

1993 births
Living people
Belgian footballers
Belgian Pro League players
Challenger Pro League players
K.S.V. Roeselare players
S.V. Zulte Waregem players
Association football goalkeepers
People from Roeselare
Footballers from West Flanders